Gabriele Carannante (born 27 February 1999) is an Italian football player. He plays for  club Grosseto.

Club career
He spent the first several seasons of his senior career in Serie D.

On 2 September 2019 he joined Serie C club Pianese on loan from Parma.

He made his professional Serie C debut for Pianese on 15 September 2019 in a game against AlbinoLeffe. He started the game and was substituted at half-time.

On 14 September 2020 he was loaned to Legnago. On 28 January 2021 he moved on loan to Turris.

On 17 September 2021, he joined Casertana in Serie D.

References

External links
 

1999 births
Footballers from Naples
Living people
Italian footballers
Association football midfielders
U.S. Vibonese Calcio players
S.S. Monopoli 1966 players
F.C. Legnago Salus players
F.C. Grosseto S.S.D. players
Serie C players
Serie D players